Riccardo Nardini (born 27 June 1983) is an Italian football defender who plays for Aglianese.

References

External links
 
 Nardini in gazzetta.it
 Nardini in AIC

1983 births
Sportspeople from the Province of Modena
Living people
Italian footballers
Association football midfielders
U.S. Poggibonsi players
A.C. Prato players
A.S.D. Sangiovannese 1927 players
Calcio Foggia 1920 players
Catania S.S.D. players
Modena F.C. players
Reggina 1914 players
U.S. Avellino 1912 players
A.C. Reggiana 1919 players
Empoli F.C. players
Ascoli Calcio 1898 F.C. players
A.C.R. Messina players
F.C. Pro Vercelli 1892 players
U.S. Pistoiese 1921 players
Serie A players
Serie B players
Serie C players
Serie D players
Footballers from Emilia-Romagna